Norma Aleandro (born 2 May 1936) is an Argentine actress. She is considered one of the most celebrated and prolific Argentine actresses of all time and is recognized as a cultural icon in her home country.

Aleandro starred in the 1985 film The Official Story, a role that earned her the Cannes Award for best actress. She has performed in other successful films like The Truce (1974), Cousins (1989), Autumn Sun (1996), The Lighthouse (1998), Son of the Bride (2001) and Cama Adentro (2005). For her performance as Florencia Sánchez Morales in the 1987 film Gaby: A True Story, she received a Golden Globe nomination and an Academy Award nomination for Best Supporting Actress.

Aleandro wrote the 1970 film The Inheritors and performed in various plays such as August: Osage County. Aleandro also appeared in the Argentine adaptation of BeTipul, the critically successful En terapia.

Life and career 

Aleandro was born in Buenos Aires on 2 May 1936. She is the daughter of actors Pedro Aleandro and María Luisa Robledo and the sister of actress María Vaner. During the late 1970s, she was vocal about her progressive views and during the military dictatorship she was exiled to Uruguay. Later Aleandro moved to Spain and did not return to Argentina until after the military junta fell in 1983.

In 1985, her breakout role was the Argentine Academy Award-winning film The Official Story. For her acting in the film she won the Cannes Award for best actress.

She worked in several other Argentine movies such as the Academy Award-nominated Son of the Bride, Sol de Otoño, and El Faro.

Aleandro co-starred in a few Hollywood films such as One Man's War, with Anthony Hopkins, and Gaby: A True Story (1987) for which she received an Oscar nomination. She also had a minor role in Cousins (1989).

Back in Argentina, she returned to the stage with Master Class and won the María Guerrero award in 1996. The same year, she was honored as Ciudadano Ilustre de la Ciudad de Buenos Aires ("Illustrious Citizen of the City of Buenos Aires").

She has co-starred five times with fellow actor Héctor Alterio: Los siete Locos (1973), the Academy Award-nominated The Truce (1974), The Official Story (1985), Son of the Bride (2001) and Cleopatra (2003), the last three of which they played husband and wife.

In 2009, Aleandro appeared in The City of Your Final Destination, directed by James Ivory and co-starring Anthony Hopkins, Laura Linney and Charlotte Gainsbourg.

Filmography

Awards

Wins 
 Cannes Award: Best Actress for The Official Story, 1985
 New York Film Critics Circle Awards: Best Actress for The Official Story, 1985
 Cartagena Film Festival: Best Actress for The Official Story, 1985
 David di Donatello: Best Foreign Actress for The Official Story, 1987
 Donostia-San Sebastián International Film Festival: Best Actress for Sol de Otoño, 1996
 Havana Film Festival: Best Actress for Sol de Otoño, 1996
 Gramado Film Festival: Best Latin Actress for Son of the Bride, 2002

Nominated 
 Academy Award: Best Supporting Actress for Gaby: A True Story, 1987
 Golden Globe Award: Best Supporting Actress for Gaby: A True Story, 1987
 Martín Fierro Awards: for En terapia, 2012, 2013

Other awards 
 Konex Award: Diamond Award in 2001
 Argentine Film Critics Association Awards: Best Supporting Actress for Son of the Bride, 2001; Best Actress for Sol de Otoño, 1996; Best Actress for The Official Story, 1985
 Martín Fierro Awards: Six awards throughout the years
 Tato Award: Best Lead Actress in Drama, for En terapia, 2013
 Association of Latin Entertainment Critics Awards: Best Character Actress for Cama Adentro, 2006; Best Actress for The Official Story, 1986
 Obie Award: Distinguished Performance (Actress) for About Love and Other Stories About Love, 1985
 Shakespeare Award: Distinguished career, given by Fundación Romeo Argentina, 2015

References

External links 

 
 
 

1936 births
Living people
Argentine film actresses
Argentine stage actresses
Argentine television actresses
Actresses from Buenos Aires
Cannes Film Festival Award for Best Actress winners
David di Donatello winners
Argentine expatriates in Uruguay
Argentine expatriates in Spain